"OMG What's Happening" is a song by American singer Ava Max, released through Atlantic Records as the seventh single from her debut studio album, Heaven & Hell (2020). It was released on September 3, 2020. The disco-funk and disco-pop song was written by Max, Roland Spreckley, Henri Antero Salonen, Sorana Păcurar, Cirkut and Jason Gill, and produced by the latter two writers alongside Hank Solo. A music video was released on October 29, 2020, which was directed by American music video director Hannah Lux Davis. It depicts Max racing against other drivers in muscle cars.

Background and development
Max first teased the release of "OMG What's Happening" on her social media accounts on August 31, 2020. She posted the song's official cover art on September 2, 2020, and announced that it would be released the next day, stating that it was one of her favorite songs on Heaven & Hell. The cover art depicts Max wearing a red cowboy hat and gloves, while standing on top of a monster truck. "OMG What's Happening" was written by Max, Roland Spreckley, Henri Antero Salonen, Sorana Pacurar, with producers Cirkut and Jason Gill. Hank Solo was also involved in production. The lyric, "There's something about your face / I don't know whether to kiss it or punch it" was initially recorded by Max in quarantine from the 2020 COVID-19 pandemic as a joke, but she decided to keep it in the song.

Composition and critical reception
"OMG What's Happening" is a disco-funk and disco-pop song. Jon Pareles of The New York Times stated that it was part of the "disco revival" preceded by music released from Doja Cat, Dua Lipa, and Lady Gaga, while Issei Honke of Billboard Japan additionally specified that "OMG What's Happening" followed 2020 songs such as Doja Cat's "Say So" (2020), and Lipa's "Don't Start Now" (2019). The song contains Dominican bachata guitar syncopations which transition into disco hi-hats, synthesizers and rhythm guitar. It also uses a chord progression from Gloria Gaynor's 1978 song "I Will Survive", which inverses its lyrical message about being "smitten" in place of the original song's message of "independence". "OMG What's Happening" utilizes vibey hooks and a spoken-word bridge, while Max performed high-wire vocal undulations compared to Marina Diamandis.

Mike Wass from Idolator described "OMG What's Happening" as a "loved-up banger" that "finds the pop star head over heels". Writing for Us Weekly, Nicholas Hautman stated that it was "disco realness", while Honke wrote that the song resembled a "disco-like atmosphere" from the late 1970s.

Music video
American music video director Hannah Lux Davis announced her involvement in the music video on her social media accounts on September 2, 2020. It was filmed during the same weekend as Max's 2020 song "Naked", which was also directed by Davis. Prior to the video's release, Max mentioned that it involved a large truck and several fast muscle cars in the desert. A lyric video was released on September 3, 2020, which coincided with the song's release. The music video was released on October 29, 2020, which depicts Max as a driver on a truck covered with flames, while racing on an empty highway against another taunting driver.

Personnel
Credits adapted from Tidal.

 Amanda Ava Koci vocals, songwriting
 Henry Walter songwriting, production
 Jason Gill songwriting, production
 Henri Antero Salonen songwriting
 Roland Spreckley songwriting
 Sorana Pacurar songwriting
 Hank Solo production
 Chris Gehringer mastering
 Serban Ghenea mixing
 John Hanes engineering

Charts

Weekly charts

Year-end charts

Certifications

Release history

References

2020 singles
2020 songs
Ava Max songs
Atlantic Records singles
Music videos directed by Hannah Lux Davis
Song recordings produced by Cirkut (record producer)
Songs written by Ava Max
Songs written by Cirkut (record producer)
Songs written by Jason Gill (musician)
Songs written by Sorana (singer)